The Independent National Security Legislation Monitor (INSLM) is a statutory independent executive oversight body of the Australian Government responsible for the ongoing review of the operation, effectiveness and implications of Australian counter‑terrorism and national security legislation. The INSLM also considers whether legislation contains appropriate safeguards for protecting the rights of individuals, remains proportionate to any threat of terrorism and or threat to national security, and remains necessary. As such the INSLM is a major part of the oversight regime of the Australian Intelligence Community together with the Inspector-General of Intelligence and Security and the Parliamentary Joint Committee on Intelligence and Security.

History
The INSLM was established by the Independent National Security Legislation Monitor Act 2010.  The post has many similarities with the role of Independent Reviewer of Terrorism Legislation in the United Kingdom.

Role
Since 2011, the INSLM has conducted inquiries on national security legislative issues and issued reports assessing counter-terrorism and national security legislation and making recommendations for reform. Australian security and intelligence agencies provide the INSLM with information (both classified and unclassified), relevant to the above functions. This is under compulsion in some circumstances. The INSLM makes recommendations on these matters in reports, which are then tabled in Parliament.

The following subject specific reports have been published:

Telecommunications and other Legislation Amendment (Assistance and Access) Act 2018 and related matters 
9 July 2020

On 30 June 2020, the INSLM (Dr James Renwick CSC SC) completed his report on Telecommunications and other Legislation Amendment (Assistance & Access) Act 2018 and related matters.  This was a matter referred to the INSLM by the Parliamentary Joint Committee on Intelligence and Security (PJCIS).

Review of the terrorism-related citizenship loss provisions in the Australia Citizenship Act 2007 
18 September 2019

The Attorney-General the Hon Christian Porter MP, referred for my review the operation, effectiveness and implications of the terrorism-related citizenship loss provisions in the Australian Citizenship Act 2007, to be reported on by 15 August 2019.

The prosecution and sentencing of children for terrorism 
2 April 2019

Under s 7 of the INSLM Act, following a suggestion made by the CDPP, Ms Sarah McNaughton SC,  the then Prime Minister, the Hon Malcolm Turnbull MP, referred for review the matter of ‘the prosecution and sentencing of children for terrorism offences’.

INSLM Statutory Deadline Reviews 
5 March 2018

On 7 September 2017, the INSLM Dr James Renwick SC completed his reports on Statutory Deadline Reviews which includes legislation for: Division 3A of Part 1AA of the Crimes Act (Stop, Search & Seize powers), Sections 119.2 and 119.3 of the Criminal Code (Declared Areas), and Divisions 104 and 105 of the Criminal Code (Control Orders & Preventative Detention Orders) including the interoperability of the control order regime and the High Risk Terrorist Offenders Act 2016.

Certain Questioning and Detention Powers in Relation to Terrorism 
8 February 2017

Certain Matters Regarding the Impact of Amendments to the Counter-Terrorism Legislation Amendment (Foreign Fighters) Bill 2014 
2 May 2016

On 2 May 2016 the former INSLM, the Hon. Roger Gyles AO QC, completed a report on the impacts of certain amendments proposed to the Counter-Terrorism Legislation Amendment (Foreign Fighters) Bill 2014 by the Parliamentary Joint Committee on Intelligence and Security. This was a matter referred to the INSLM by the Prime Minister.

Section 35P of the ASIO Act 
2 February 2016

On 21 October 2015 the former INSLM, the Hon. Roger Gyles AO QC, completed a report on the impact on journalists of section 35P of the Australian Security Intelligence Organisation Act 1979 (ASIO Act). This was a matter referred to the INSLM by the then Prime Minister.

This report discusses the impact on journalists of the operation of section 35P of the ASIO Act concerning offences for the disclosure of information relating to a special intelligence operation.

Control Order Safeguards 
29 January 2016

On 29 January 2016 the former INSLM, the Hon. Roger Gyles AO QC, completed Part 1 of a report on whether a system of special advocates should be implemented in relation to the control order regime. This was a matter referred to the INSLM by the then Prime Minister.

On 20 April 2016, Part 2 of the Control Order Safeguards Report was completed. Part 2 of the Report considered other additional safeguards recommended in the 2013 Council of Australian Government Review of Counter-Terrorism Legislation in relation to the control order regime.

The following Annual Reports have been published:

Independent National Security Legislation Monitor Annual Report 2018-2019 26 February 2020 
26 February 2020

The eighth report, provided by the INSLM, Dr James Renwick CSC SC as the Independent National Security Legislation Monitor (INSLM).

This annual report relates to the period between 1 July 2018 and 30 June 2019.

Independent National Security Legislation Monitor Annual Report 2017-2018 
2 April 2019

The seventh annual report, provided by the INSLM, Dr James Renwick SC as the Independent National Security Legislation Monitor (INSLM).

This annual report relates to the period between 1 July 2017 and 30 June 2018.

Independent National Security Legislation Monitor Annual Report 2017 
4 December 2017

The seventh annual report, provided by the INSLM, Dr James Renwick SC as the Independent National Security Legislation Monitor (INSLM).

This annual report relates to the period between 1 July 2016 and 30 June 2017.

Independent National Security Legislation Monitor Annual Report 2016 
13 October 2016

Independent National Security Legislation Monitor Annual Report 2015 
7 December 2015

Independent National Security Legislation Monitor Annual Report 2014 
28 March 2014

Independent National Security Legislation Monitor Annual Report 2013 
7 November 2013

Independent National Security Legislation Monitor Annual Report 2012 
20 December 2012

Independent National Security Legislation Monitor Annual Report 2011 
16 December 2011

Office-holders
 Mr Bret Walker SC (21 April 2011 to 20 April 2014)
 The Hon Roger Gyles AO QC (20 August 2015 to 31 October 2016)
 Dr James Renwick CSC SC (February 2017 to 30 June 2020)
 Mr Grant Donaldson SC (current)

See also
 Australian Intelligence Community
 Inspector-General of Intelligence and Security

References

External links
Independent National Security Legislation Monitor
2017 Independent Review of the Australian Intelligence Community 

Australian intelligence agencies
Commonwealth Government agencies of Australia
Intelligence analysis agencies